Glyceria melicaria, the melic mannagrass or northeastern mannagrass, is a perennial grass found in the eastern United States. Its specific epithet melicaria means "similar to Melica". Its diploid number is 40.

Description

Its leaf sheaths are smooth and its ligules are translucent. The panicle's closely appressed floral branches have thirty to upwards of sixty spikelets per branch. Its appressed spikelets are about 4 mm long and have three to four flowers.
Its glumes are lanceolate and have acute apices. The lower glume is 1.3-2.4 mm and the upper glume is 1.7-3 mm. Its five- to seven-veined lemmas are 1.9-2.8 mm long, with its paleas roughly the same size. The grass flowers from late June to August.

Glyceria × gatineauensis is a sterile hybrid between Glyceria striata and G. melicaria which has been found to occur in Quebec and possibly West Virginia. The hybrid is a triploid.

Habitat and distribution

Glyceria melicaria grows in wet soils, swamps, and wet forests from New Brunswick to Ontario and south into Illinois and the northeastern United States, as well as down into the Appalachian Mountains as far south as northern Georgia.

References

melicaria
Plants described in 1912